Industrial Bank of Korea (IBK) is a state-owned bank headquartered in Jung-gu, Seoul, South Korea. Under the Industrial Bank of Korea Act, IBK was established to promote small and medium-sized businesses and improve their economic status by providing an efficient credit system.

International Locations
 Cambodia (Phnom Penh)
 Mainland China (Beijing, Shenzhen, Qingdao, Shenyang, Wuhan, Suzhou, Tianjin, and Yantai)
 Hong Kong (Hong Kong Island)
 India (New Delhi)
 Indonesia
 Japan (Tokyo)
 Myanmar (Yangon)
 Philippines (Metro Manila)
 United Kingdom (London)
 United States (New York)
 Vietnam (Hanoi and Ho Chi Minh)

See also

 Economy of South Korea
 List of Banks in South Korea
 Hwaseong IBK Altos

References

External links
 IBK's Korean Homepage
 IBK's Global Homepage

Banks of South Korea
Companies listed on the Korea Exchange
Companies based in Seoul
Banks established in 1961
South Korean brands
Government-owned banks
Government-owned companies of South Korea